The following is a list of Lamar Cardinals football seasons for the football team that has represented Lamar University in NCAA competition.

Seasons
This listing includes only the seasons Lamar competed as a four-year college beginning with the 1951 season.

See also
Lamar Cardinals football

References

Lamar Cardinals
Lamar Cardinals football seasons